Folwarki may refer to the following places in Poland:
 Folwarki, Świętokrzyskie Voivodeship (central south Poland)
 Folwarki, Subcarpathian Voivodeship (south east Poland)
 Rowień-Folwarki in Silesian Voivodeship (south Poland)